The men's water polo tournament at the 2018 Mediterranean Games was held from 27 June to 1 July at the Campclar Aquatic Center in Tarragona.

Participating teams

 (host)

Preliminary round
All times are local (UTC+2).

Group A

Group B

Finals

Seventh place game

Fifth place game

Third place game

Final

Final standings

References

External links
2018 Mediterranean Games

Water polo at the 2018 Mediterranean Games